Henk Temming (17 November 1923 – 23 April 2018) was a Dutch professional footballer who played for VV DOS and Velox. He was also part of the Dutch squad for the 1948 Summer Olympics, but he did not play in any matches. His nephew, Mosje Temming, was also a footballer.

Honours
DOS
 Eredivisie: 1957–58

References

1923 births
2018 deaths
Dutch footballers
VV DOS players
Eredivisie players
Association football midfielders
Footballers from Utrecht (city)
FC Utrecht players